The Uzbekistan Football Coach of the Year (Uzbek:Yilning eng yaxshi murabbiyi or Йилнинг энг яхши мураббийи) is a yearly award organized by the Uzbekistan Football Association and given to the Uzbek football coach who is considered to have performed the best during the year.

History
The award has been given since 1996. Igor Shkvyrin and Mirjalol Kasymov are the only people to have won both Coach of the Year and Footballer of the Year awards.

Coach of the Year Award Winners

By coach

By team

See also
 Uzbekistan Footballer of the Year

References

External links
 Uzbekistan - Footballer and Coach of the Year

Coach
Awards established in 1996
1996 establishments in Uzbekistan
Annual events in Uzbekistan